48 class may refer to:

British Rail Class 48
New South Wales 48 class locomotive